Juri Schlünz (born 27 July 1961 in East Berlin, East Germany) is a German football coach and former player. As of 2009, he is the youth teams coordinator with Hansa Rostock.

Honours
 East Germany champion: 1991
 East German Cup winner: 1991

References

Living people
1961 births
People from East Berlin
Association football midfielders
East German footballers
German footballers
German football managers
FC Hansa Rostock players
FC Hansa Rostock managers
Footballers from Berlin
DDR-Oberliga players